Coptostomabarbus wittei (common name: upjaw barb) is a species of cyprinid in the genus Coptostomabarbus. It inhabits Angola, Botswana, the Democratic Republic of the Congo, Zambia and Zimbabwe. It is used by humans as food

References

External links
 Profile at FishBase

Cyprinidae
Cyprinid fish of Africa
Fish of Angola
Fish of Botswana
Fish of the Democratic Republic of the Congo
Fish of Zambia
Fish of Zimbabwe